William Darling Inglis Sr. (October 21, 1874 – October 6, 1969) was an American football player and coach and physician. He served as the head football coach at his alma mater, Washington & Jefferson College, in Canonsburg, Pennsylvania in 1898, compiling a record of 9–2. Inglis was a 1902 graduate of the Ohio State University College of Medicine.

Head coaching record

References

External links
 

1874 births
1969 deaths
19th-century players of American football
20th-century American physicians
American football centers
American football guards
Greensburg Athletic Association players
Ohio State University College of Medicine alumni
Washington & Jefferson Presidents football coaches
Washington & Jefferson Presidents football players
People from Washington County, Pennsylvania
Coaches of American football from Pennsylvania
Players of American football from Pennsylvania